Estradiol undecylenate (EUe; developmental code name SH-368) is an estrogen medication and estrogen ester which was never marketed. It is the C17β undecenoate (undecylenate) ester of estradiol. Following an intramuscular injection, EUe has a very prolonged effect, exceeding that of other estradiol esters like estradiol valerate and estradiol enanthate. Due to its very long duration of action, EUe releases only subthreshold amounts of estradiol at conventional doses. However, this may still be useful in menopausal hormone therapy.

See also
 Estradiol diundecylenate
 List of estrogen esters § Estradiol esters

References

Abandoned drugs
Estradiol esters
Phenols
Prodrugs
Synthetic estrogens
Undecylenate esters